Tennessee is a ship name. 

It may refer to:

 , several civilian steam-powered ships of the name
 , a sidewheel steamer lost in 1865, that was also the Republic, USS Tennessee, CSS Tennessee, USS Mobile
 , a sidewheel steamer lost in 1870, built as a gunboat that was rebuilt as a merchantman, formerly USS Muscoota
 , an early 20th century ship of the Joy Steamship Company operating in the Long Island Sound
 , a cargo ship torpedoed and sunk by U-617 in 1942; formerly Fredensbro
 , several ships of the U.S. Navy with the name
 , originally SS Tennessee, was a paddle steamer captured from the Confederacy in 1862; formerly CSS Tennessee, later becoming USS Mobile in 1864; becoming SS Republic after the war
 , a Confederate ironclad captured in 1864; formerly CSS Tennessee
 , a wooden screw frigate originally built and named as USS Madawaska; becoming Tennessee after the war
 , the lead ship of the 
 , an 
 , several naval ships of the Confederate States of America with the name
 , a steamship built in 1853 as SS Tennessee; seized by the Confederate States in 1861 becoming CSS Tennessee; captured by the Union, becoming USS Tennessee; later renamed USS Mobile in 1864; becoming SS Republic after the war
 , a  burned in the stocks prior to completion
 , ironclad launched in 1863, captured by the Union in 1864 and renamed USS Tennessee
 , sunk in 1940
 , a European inland waterways cargo ship 
 , general cargo ship
 , a general cargo container ship of the Maersk Line

See also
 Tennessee-class, several ship classes

References

Ship names